Chabulina tenera is a moth in the family Crambidae. It was described by Arthur Gardiner Butler in 1883. It is found on Sulawesi.

References

Moths described in 1883
Spilomelinae